Hebron is a village and civil parish  north of Morpeth, in the county of Northumberland, England. In 2011 the parish had a population of 422. The parish touches Longhirst, Meldon, Mitford, Morpeth, Netherwitton, Pegswood, Tritlington and West Chevington and Ulgham. Until April 2009 the parish was in Castle Morpeth district. The surname "Hebron" derives from Hebron.

Landmarks 
There are 9 listed buildings in Hebron. Hebron has a church called St Cuthbert.

History 
The name "Hebron" means 'The high burial-mound'. The parish included the townships of Causey Park, Cockle Park, Earsdon, Earsdon Forest, Fenrother and Tritlington. On 1 April 1955 the parishes of Benridge, Cockle Park and High and Low Highlaws were abolished and merged with Hebron.

References

External links 

 

Villages in Northumberland
Civil parishes in Northumberland